Escazú (canton), a canton in the province of San José in Costa Rica
 Escazú (district), a district of the above canton